Jean-Paul Jaeger is the emeritus Bishop of Arras, France.

Jaeger, was born on September 6, 1944, in Nancy, Meurthe-et-Moselle.  He obtained his License degrees from the Université de Lille. Jaeger was ordained as a priest for the Diocese of Lille on April 6, 1974.  From 1974 to 1991 he was a teacher and administrator in various schools, becoming Superior of the diocesan seminary at Lille. He was appointed Co-adjutor Bishop of the Diocese of Nancy-Toul on April 11, 1991, and became titular bishop on 30 November of the same year. Since August 12, 1998, he has been Bishop of Arras, succeeding Monsignor Henri Derouet.

From 2007 he was a member of the Permanent Council of the French Conference of Bishops.  His term has ended.

Msgr. Jaeger was named a Chevalier of the Legion of Honour on 14 July 2012.

See also
 Catholic Church in France
 List of the Roman Catholic dioceses of France

References

1944 births
Living people
Bishops of Arras
Clergy from Nancy, France
21st-century Roman Catholic bishops in France
Roman Catholic monks
20th-century Roman Catholic bishops in France